Mann Kee Awaaz Pratigya is an Indian television series which aired on STAR Plus. The series premiered on 7 December 2009 and was ended on 27 October 2012. It starred Pooja Gor and Arhaan Behll. All episodes of the series re-telecasted at Star Bharat from October 2020 to March 2021. A new season of the series Mann Kee Awaaz Pratigya 2 premiered on 15 March 2021 on Star Bharat produced by Director's Kut Productions.

Plot

It is the story of a woman Pratigya Saxena who will go to any lengths to fight for her rights. Krishna Singh Thakur belongs to the Thakur family known for their power in Allahabad. The Thakurs, headed by Krishna's father, Sajjan Singh Thakur, are rooted deep in tradition and superstition. The Saxena family, however, are traditional but believe in progressive thinking and educating their daughters Pratigya and Aarushi. Krishna Singh Thakur and Pratigya Saxena eventually fall in love despite seeming incompatible in the beginning.

Krishna is Pratigya's secret admirer, and he forces her to marry him. To protect Pratigya, her elder brother Adarsh Saxena marries Komal Singh Thakur, Krishna's younger sister. Pratigya is not satisfied with her marriage, but over time she realises Krishna's genuine love for her.

Krishna's elder brother, Shakti Singh Thakur, causes his wife Kesar Shakti Singh Thakur to lose her mental stability. As a result, Pratigya starts caring for Shakti and Kesar's son, Samar. Shakti marries Menaka Shakti Singh Thakur, who wants to usurp the property of the Thakur family. Abhimanyu Singh Yadav, Sajjan Singh Thakur's illegitimate son, emerges and stakes claim to his rights and start planning against the family. Meanwhile, in the Saxena household, Tanmay Srivastav, Aarushi's husband, plans to kill Adarsh and finally kills Adarsh and frames Krishna for Adarsh's murder.

The show takes a leap when Pratigya and Krishna officially adopt Samar. The show ends with Pratigya gets pregnant and give birth to a baby girl, and the whole family celebrates.

Cast

Main cast
 Pooja Gor as Pratigya Saxena / Pratigya Krishna Singh Thakur – Naina and Shyam's elder daughter; Adarsh and Aarushi's sister; Krishna's wife; Samar's adoptive mother; Kriti's mother (2009−2012) 
 Arhaan Behll as Krishna Singh Thakur – Sajjan and Sumitra's younger son; Shakti and Komal's brother; Abhimanyu's half-brother; Pratigya's husband; Samar's adoptive father; Kriti's father (2009−2012)

Recurring cast
 Parvati Sehgal as Komal Singh Thakur/ Komal Adarsh Saxena – Sajjan and Sumitra's daughter; Shakti and Krishna's younger sister; Abhimanyu's half-sister; Adarsh's widow; Kartik's wife; Chinky's mother. 
 Shahab Khan as Shyam Saxena – Naina's husband; Adarsh, Pratigya and Aarushi's father; Chinky and Kriti's grandfather.
 Monica Singh as Naina Shyam Saxena – Shyam's wife; Adarsh, Pratigya and Aarushi's mother; Chinky and Kriti's grandmother. (Dead). (9 December 2009 - 26 July 2011)
 Avantika Hundal as Aarushi Saxena – Naina and Shyam's younger daughter; Adarsh and Pratigya's younger sister; Tanmay's ex-wife.
 Kunal Karan Kapoor as Angad Yadav – Thug; Pratigya and Komal's foe (2010) (Dead)
 Ankit Gera / Aniruddh Singh as Adarsh Saxena – Naina and Shyam's son; Pratigya and Aarushi's elder brother; Komal's husband; Chinky's father. (Dead)
Unknown as Chinky Saxena – Adarsh and Komal's daughter.
 Arya Kumar / Malhar Pandya as Kartik Saxena – Komal's second husband 
 Anupam Shyam as Sajjan Singh Thakur – Sumitra's husband; Shakti, Krishna, Komal and Abhimanyu's father; Chinky, Samar and Kriti's grandfather. 
 Asmita Sharma as Sumitra Sajjan Singh Thakur – Sankata's sister; Sajjan's wife; Shakti, Krishna and Komal's mother; Chinky, Samar and Kriti's grandmother.
 Jaswant Menaria as Shakti Singh Thakur – Sajjan and Sumitra's elder son; Krishna and Komal's elder brother; Abhimanyu's half-brother; Kesar and Menaka's husband; Samar's father
 Kalpna Bohra / Aalika Sheikh as Kesar Shakti Singh Thakur – Shakti's first wife; Samar's mother 
 Eklavya Ahir as Samar Singh Thakur – Kesar and Shakti's son; Krishna and Pratigya's adoptive son
 Soni Singh as Menaka Shakti Singh Thakur – Shakti's second wife
 Asha Sharma as Mrs. Saxena – Shyam's mother; Adarsh, Pratigya and Aarushi's grandmother
 Mohit Malik as Abhimanyu Singh Yadav – Sajjan's son; Shakti, Krishna and Komal's half-brother
 Abhishek Rawat as Tanmay Srivastav – Aarushi's ex-husband
 Amita Udgata as Mrs. Singh Thakur – Sajjan's mother; Shakti, Krishna, Komal and Abhimanyu's grandmother
 Akhilendra Mishra as Sankata Singh – Sumitra's brother
 Sana Amin Sheikh as Ganga – Sajjan's mistress
Deeya Chopra as Anu Mathur – Aman's wife
Piyush Sahdev as Aman Mathur – Aarushi's ex-fiancé
Sehrish Ali as Roli – Pratigya's friend
Manmohan Tiwari as Radhe
 Prachi Pathak as Maayi
Kunal Jaisingh as Gunga
 Sachin Sharma as Gaurav Mathur (2010)
 Chetan Pandit as Sarveshwardayal Mathur (2010)
 Kunal Madhiwala as Lucky
 Dinesh Soi as Jugnu
Vinay Rajput as Tunna
Pratima Kazmi as Guru Maa
Sonal Jha as Shakuntala Devi
Nirbhay Wadhwa as Goon
Mayank Arora as Jay Mathur
Raj Premi as Makhnu Singh
 Jaydeep Suri
Deepika Singh as Sandhya
Sanaya Irani as Khushi
Manasi Parekh as Gulaal

Adaptations
The was remade in Marathi as Devyani on Star Pravah. It was dubbed in Telugu on Star Maa as Pavitra.

Production

Promotion
As a part of promotion of the series before its launch, in December 2009, a campaign was done as Meri Pratigya at Nariman Point in Mumbai where along with lead Pooja Gor, 500 women as a chain to create an awareness on eve-teasing and ill treatment of women.

Casting
Parvati Sehgal who played Komal's role in the show was originally approached for Aarushi's role but got rejected because of a look test but later got selected for Komal's role when she was approached for the second time.

Falaq Naaz was originally signed to play an uneducated village girl Shakun in the show who was Abhimanyu's wife but things couldn't work out as she chose another show of Star Plus Khamoshiyan later her role got scrapped from the show. Rohit Khurana was finalized for Krishna's role but rejected it as he was busy with Uttaran at that time.

In mid 2011, Monica Singh playing Naina quit the series and was hoped for coming back after a break. However, as she refused returning, the makers decided to end her character and she agreed to shoot for two days but did not turn up. Thus, her character was mentioned dead in a car accident.

Cancellation and future
The series was off aired in October 2012. In early 2013, the series was confirmed returning with a new season based on story of lead character Pratigya and Krishna's daughters. Neha Marda was roped as one of the leads and the pilot episode was shot and approved by the channel but the series was dropped when the discussions between the production house and channel stalled. However, on 19 February 2021, the series was confirmed returning with a new season on Star Bharat. Mann Kee Awaaz Pratigya 2 premiered on 15 March 2021, is produced by former season producer Pearl Grey along with Rajan Shahi under Director's Kut Productions.

Filming
Based on the backdrop of Uttar Pradesh, Allahabad, the series was mainly filmed at sets in Film city in Mumbai while some sequences were also shot at Allahabad.

Reception

Critics
The Indian Express stated, "It's a perfect Hindi heartland show - over-the-top drama and aggressive, regressive as well as progressive in characters and content."

In November 2010, Deccan Herald criticised, "The serial that broke many a record on Star Plus because of its unique anti-eve teasing storyline, seems to have changed track completely. Today, it’s boiled down to a tale where a woman is humiliated at home, her self respect trampled on by her in-laws and husband instead of portraying her to be a strong woman who stands her ground."

The Hindu criticised, "From the current crop of serials, a very good example of enthusiastic consumption of a bizarre plot line is the serial “Mann ki Awaaz Pratigya”. The production house, Star TV, bills it a “fight against disrespect of women”. And what does the lead character do? She marries a goon who eve-teases her. Then she tells him that he can win her body but not her love. You fight disrespect by marrying the eve-teaser, taking the battle into his home."

Ratings
Pratigya opened with a rating of 3.7 TVR. As in April 2010, it was one of the top ten Hindi GEC which garnered 4.5 TVR. As in July 2010, it was at second position with ratings ranging 4 to 5.3 TVR. In weeks 24 and 25 of 2010, it garnered 4.8 and 5.5 TVRs. In week 4 of 2011, it garnered 5.7 TVR. As in week 29 of 2011, it dropped to 3.9 TVR while its peak ratings garnered were around 6 TVR in its run time. In the week ending 27 September 2011, it garnered 4.27 TVR occupying fourth position. When the ratings dropped ranging between 2 and 2.5 TVR, it was off aired on October 2012.

Awards

References

External links
 Official Website on hotstar

Indian drama television series
Indian television soap operas
Television series about marriage
Television series about dysfunctional families
Domestic violence in television
Hindi serials focus on violence against women
2009 Indian television series debuts
StarPlus original programming
2012 Indian television series endings
Television shows set in Uttar Pradesh